"Llamé Pa' Verte (Bailando Sexy)" is the third single of Wisin & Yandel's album Pa'l Mundo,
released in 2005.

Charts

Weekly charts

Year-end charts

External links
 Llamé Pa' Verte lyrics at letssingit.com

References

2005 singles
Wisin & Yandel songs
Spanish-language songs
Song recordings produced by Luny Tunes
2005 songs
Machete Music singles